National Tertiary Route 710, or just Route 710 (or ) is a National Road Route of Costa Rica, located in the Alajuela province.

Description
In Alajuela province the route covers Naranjo canton (Cirrí Sur, San Jerónimo districts), Sarchí canton (Sarchí Norte, Rodríguez districts).

References

Highways in Costa Rica